The term preorder may refer to:

In mathematics:
Preorder, a reflexive, transitive relation
Preorder field, a field of sets structure on a set with preorder
Preordered field, a field with a preorder
Preordering, a vertex ordering from a tree or other graph traversal; see Depth-first search#Vertex orderings

In marketing:
Pre-order – an order placed for an item which has not yet been released.